Delsarte may refer to

 François Delsarte, French musician, founder of the Delsarte System 
 Jean Delsarte, French mathematician

French-language surnames